The 25 Hours of Thunderhill is an endurance racing event held annually during the first weekend in December in Northern California, at the Thunderhill Raceway Park; just outside the small city of Willows. The race is longest road event on a closed course in the United States.

It has been run since 2003, sanctioned by the National Auto Sport Association. It is the successor to the Timex 12 Hours of Thunderhill event run between 1998 and 2002.

References

Endurance motor racing